Yevgeniy Petrovich Alexeyev (born 11 December 1977 in Shymkent) is a Kazakhstani sprint canoeist. He won a gold medal, as a member of the Kazakhstan men's kayak four, at the 2002 Asian Games in Busan, South Korea, and silver at the 2010 Asian Games in Guangzhou, China. He also captured a bronze medal, along with his partner Alexey Podoinikov in the men's kayak doubles (1000 m) at the 2006 Asian Games in Doha, Qatar.

Alexeyev qualified for the men's K-2 1000 metres at the 2012 Summer Olympics in London by placing first from the 2011 Asian Canoe Sprint Championships in Tehran, Iran. Alexeyev and his partner Alexey Dergunov paddled to a third-place finish, and eleventh overall in the B-final by approximately two seconds behind the winning Danish pair Kim Wraae Knudsen and Emil Stær Simensen, posting their best Olympic time of 3:14.867. Three days later, the Kazakh pair edged out Japan's Momotaro Matsushita and Hiroki Watanabe for first place by twenty-four hundredths of a second (0.24), in the B-final of the men's K-2 200 metres, clocking at 35.494 seconds.

References

External links
NBC Olympics Profile

1977 births
Kazakhstani male canoeists
Living people
Olympic canoeists of Kazakhstan
Canoeists at the 2012 Summer Olympics
Canoeists at the 2016 Summer Olympics
Asian Games medalists in canoeing
People from Shymkent
Canoeists at the 2002 Asian Games
Canoeists at the 2006 Asian Games
Canoeists at the 2010 Asian Games
Canoeists at the 2014 Asian Games
Canoeists at the 2018 Asian Games
Asian Games gold medalists for Kazakhstan
Asian Games silver medalists for Kazakhstan
Asian Games bronze medalists for Kazakhstan
Medalists at the 2002 Asian Games
Medalists at the 2006 Asian Games
Medalists at the 2010 Asian Games
Medalists at the 2014 Asian Games
Medalists at the 2018 Asian Games
21st-century Kazakhstani people